Big Reed Pond is a freshwater pond located in Montauk, New York on Long Island. A  site including the pond, brackish marshland and natural sand dunes was designated as a National Natural Landmark in 1973. The largely undeveloped pond is located within Theodore Roosevelt County Park.

The Montaukett tribe lived in the vicinity of the pond until the mid-19th century.

The pond and its associated wetlands are accessible via hiking trails that are open to the public.

See also
List of National Natural Landmarks in New York

References

East Hampton (town), New York
National Natural Landmarks in New York (state)
Ponds of New York (state)
Lakes of Suffolk County, New York